Kelaart's pipistrelle (Pipistrellus ceylonicus) is a species of vesper bat found in southern and south-eastern Asia from Pakistan to Indonesia.

Description
The head and body Kelaart's pipistrelle together measure  in length. Males are larger and brighter than females. Color varies from almost dark brown to bright reddish brown, but usually reddish brown above and paler below. The wing membrane are dark brown and the body is covered with dense, short fur.

References

Pipistrellus
Mammals of Borneo
Mammals of China
Mammals of India
Mammals of Pakistan
Mammals of Sri Lanka
Mammals of Vietnam
Mammals described in 1852
Bats of Asia
Bats of Southeast Asia
Bats of Indonesia
Bats of Malaysia
Taxonomy articles created by Polbot